The Quaraí or Cuareim River (Portuguese Rio Quaraí, Spanish Río Cuareim) is a tributary of the Uruguay River.

Location
The river originates in the Coxilha de Santana (Spanish Cuchilla de Santa Ana), an area of low-lying hills, and runs westward to join the Uruguay River. It forms the boundary between Uruguay on the south and Rio Grande do Sul state of Brazil on the north.

Border dispute
There is a long-standing and unresolved border dispute between Uruguay and Brazil along part of Quaraí River. However, this is not seen as a politically disturbing issue between the two countries, which have close and friendly diplomatic relations and strong economic ties. So far, the disputed areas have been effectively under Brazilian control.

See also
 List of rivers of Uruguay
 List of rivers of Rio Grande do Sul
Brazilian Island
 Masoller#Uruguayan-Brazilian border dispute
 Geography of Uruguay#Topography and hydrography
 1851 Boundary Treaty (Brazil–Uruguay)

References

Rivers of Rio Grande do Sul
Rivers of Uruguay
Brazil–Uruguay border
Territorial disputes of Brazil
Territorial disputes of Uruguay
International rivers of South America
Rivers of Artigas Department